San Donato is a station on Line 3 of the Milan Metro in Milan, Italy. The station was opened on 12 May 1991 as part of the extension of the line from Porta Romana. It is the southern terminus of the line.

The station is located between Via Marignano and Via Giuseppe Impastato, in the municipality of Milan, near the city border with San Donato Milanese.

The station is underground with three tracks in two different tunnels.

An airplane crash happened close to this station in 2021. All of its eight passengers died in the incident.

References

External links

Line 3 (Milan Metro) stations
Railway stations opened in 1991
1991 establishments in Italy
Railway stations in Italy opened in the 20th century